Tanabe may refer to:

People
Chikara Tanabe, Japanese Olympic wrestler
Chie Tanabe, Japanese stuntwoman
Daichi Tanabe, Japanese footballer
David Tanabe (born 1980), American professional ice hockey player
Harumichi Tanabe, bureaucrat and cabinet minister in early Shōwa period Japan
Hi69, Tanabe Hiroki, Japanese professional wrestler
Hajime Tanabe, Japanese philosopher of the Kyoto School
Hisao Tanabe, Japanese musicologist
Jūji Tanabe, Japanese literature scholar, teacher, and mountain climber
Kensuke Tanabe, Japanese video game designer, producer and director
Kazuhiko Tanabe, Japanese football player
Karin Tanabe, American historical fiction novelist
Keisuke Tanabe, Japanese footballer
Kiyoshi Tanabe, Japanese Olympic boxer
Kiyoshi Tanabe (tennis), Japanese professional tennis player
Luke Tanabe, Canadian fashion designer
Masato Tanabe, American scientist
Moritake Tanabe, Japanese general during World War II
Mataemon Tanabe, Japanese martial artist
Miku Tanabe, Japanese idol
Masatake Tanabe, Mayor of Hiroshima in 1917-1921
Makoto Tanabe, Japanese politician
Nobuhiro Tanabe, Japanese politician
Norikazu Tanabe, Japanese fencer
Norio Tanabe, Japanese baseball player, coach, and manager
Ryota Tanabe, Japanese football player
Takao Tanabe CM OBC RCA (born 1926), Canadian artist
Sotan Tanabe, Japanese footballer
Seiko Tanabe, Japanese author
Seiichi Tanabe, Japanese actor
Sonny Tanabe, American Olympic competition swimmer
Ryota Tanabe, Japanese footballer
Tanabe Sakuro, Japanese civil engineer
Toma Tanabe, Japanese kickboxer
Tanabe no Sakimaro, Japanese waka poet of the Nara period
Tanabe Tomoji, Japanese supercentenarian
Yellow Tanabe, Japanese manga artist
Daichi Tanabe, Japanese footballer
Yoko Tanabe, Japanese judoka
Yuki Tanabe, Japanese handball player
Yasunori Tanabe, Japanese rower

Places
Tanabe, Wakayama, Japan
Tanabe, Kyoto, Japan

Railway stations
Kii-Tanabe Station, a railway station in Tanabe, Wakayama Prefecture, Japan
Kita-Tanabe Station, a railway station in Higashisumiyoshi-ku, Osaka, Osaka Prefecture, Japan
Minami-Tanabe Station, a railway station on the West Japan Railway
Nishi-Tanabe Station or Nishitanabe Station, a subway station on the Osaka Metro Midosuji Line
Shin-Tanabe Station, a railway station on Kintetsu Railway's Kyoto Line in Kyōtanabe, Kyoto Prefecture, Japan
Tanabe Station, a railway station on the Osaka Metro Tanimachi Line in Higashisumiyoshi-ku, Osaka, Japan

Others
Tanabe Art Museum (Tanabe Bijutsukan), in Matsue, Shimane Prefecture, Japan
Tanabe Mitsubishi Pharma SC, a Japanese football club based in Osaka
Siege of Tanabe, a battle in 1600 in Japan
Ai Tanabe, a fictional character in the manga and anime series Planetes
Tanabe Hisao Prize, for Asian musicology research
6738 Tanabe, a minor planet

Japanese-language surnames